Zavolzhye is one of the several inhabited localities in Russia.

Urban localities
Zavolzhye, Nizhny Novgorod Oblast, a town in Gorodetsky District of Nizhny Novgorod Oblast

Rural localities
Zavolzhye, Samara Oblast, a selo in Privolzhsky District of Samara Oblast
Zavolzhye, Tver Oblast, a village in Kashinsky District of Tver Oblast
Zavolzhye, Yaroslavl Oblast, a settlement in Pestretsovsky Rural Okrug of Yaroslavsky District of Yaroslavl Oblast

Historical names
Zavolzhye, former name of Zavolzhsk, a town in Ivanovo Oblast